The 2019 Alcorn State Braves football team represented Alcorn State University in the 2019 NCAA Division I FCS football season. The Braves were led by fourth-year head coach Fred McNair and played their home games at Casem-Spinks Stadium. They were members of the East Division of the Southwestern Athletic Conference (SWAC).

Preseason

Preseason polls
The SWAC released their preseason poll on July 16, 2019. The Braves were picked to finish in first place in the East Division.

Preseason all–SWAC teams
The Braves placed thirteen different players on the preseason all–SWAC teams.

Offense

1st team

Noah Johnson – QB

De'Shawn Waller – RB

Deonte Brooks – OL

Mustaffa Ibrahim – OL

Kevin Hall – OL

Defense

1st team

Solomon Muhammad – LB

Javen Morrison – DB

Qwynnterrio Cole – DB

2nd team

Darrell Henderson – DL

Theron Bonds – DL

Brelion Hollis – LB

Daylon Burks – DB

Specialists

1st team

Corey McCullough – K

2nd team

Corey McCullough – P

Schedule

Game summaries

at Southern Miss

Mississippi College

at McNeese State

Prairie View A&M

Mississippi Valley State

at Alabama State

Savannah State

Southern

at Grambling State

Alabama A&M

at Jackson State

Southern (SWAC Championship)

vs. North Carolina A&T (Celebration Bowl)

Ranking movements

References

Alcorn State
Alcorn State Braves football seasons
Southwestern Athletic Conference football champion seasons
Alcorn State Braves football